Azochis rufidiscalis is a moth in the family Crambidae. It was described by George Hampson in 1904. It is found in the Bahamas, Hispaniola, Puerto Rico, Cuba and the south-eastern United States, where it has been recorded from Florida.

The wingspan is about 22–26 mm. The forewings are white with a blackish and rufous basal patch in and beyond the end of the cell. There is a fuscous and rufous postmedial line and a triangular black mark on the termen. The hindwings are semihyaline white with a patch of black scales near the tornus. Adults have been recorded on wing from January to March, in May, July and September.

References

Moths described in 1904
Spilomelinae
Moths of North America